The Country Way is the third studio album by American country music artist Charley Pride. It was released in 1967 on the RCA Victor label (catalog no. LSP-3895). The album was awarded four-and-a-half stars from the web site AllMusic. It debuted on Billboard magazine's country album chart on December 23, 1967, peaked at No. 1, and remained on the chart for 42 weeks.

Track listing

References

1967 albums
Charley Pride albums
albums produced by Chet Atkins
albums produced by Jack Clement
albums produced by Felton Jarvis
RCA Records albums